Jorge Andrés Olaechea Quijandría (born August 27, 1956 in Ica) is a former Peruvian football defender who played 60 times for the Peru national team between 1979 and 1989.

Career
Olaechea played professional club football in Peru, Colombia and Bolivia. He helped José Carlos Mariátegui de Ica reach the finals of the 1978 Copa Perú before transferring to Alianza Lima.

Olaechea represented Peru at the 1982 FIFA World Cup and four Copa América 1979 1983 1987 and 1989.

References

External links

1956 births
Living people
Footballers from Lima
Association football defenders
Peruvian footballers
Peru international footballers
Peruvian Primera División players
Categoría Primera A players
Club Alianza Lima footballers
Independiente Medellín footballers
Deportivo Cali footballers
Sporting Cristal footballers
Club Bolívar players
Deportivo Municipal footballers
Peruvian expatriate footballers
Expatriate footballers in Colombia
Expatriate footballers in Bolivia
Peruvian expatriate sportspeople in Colombia
Peruvian expatriate sportspeople in Bolivia
1982 FIFA World Cup players
1987 Copa América players